Finn's Hotel is a posthumously-published collection of ten short narrative pieces written by Irish author James Joyce. Written in 1923, the works were not published until 2013 by Ithys Press, who claimed the work to be a precursor to Joyce's Finnegans Wake.

Publication
Ithys Press published their fine arts edition of Finn's Hotel in June 2013. The edition was arranged with a preface by Danis Rose, an introduction by Seamus Deane, featuring eleven illustrations by Casey Sorrow, and design and letterpress printed by Michael Caine.

The publication attracted controversy as some Joyce scholars labeled the works as drafts, not meant for publication.  

In the spring of 2014, James O'Sullivan wrote an article for Genetic Joyce Studies, "Finn’s Hotel and the Joycean Canon", which uses computational stylistics to analyze the text of Finn's Hotel to determine whether the text is merely early drafts or should be part of Joyce's canon.  O'Sullivan concluded that "the fragments within Finn’s Hotel are most likely drafts for what became Finnegans Wake" and that statistically "the criticisms of Ithys Press are seemingly upheld."

Print editions

References

1923 short story collections
2013 short story collections
Books published posthumously
Finnegans Wake
Short story collections by James Joyce
Unfinished books